The 1942 Western Michigan Broncos football team represented Michigan College of Education (later renamed Western Michigan University) as an independent during the 1942 college football season.  In their first season under head coach John Gill, the Broncos compiled a 5–1 record and outscored their opponents, 66 to 37.  The team played its home games at Waldo Stadium in Kalamazoo, Michigan.

Center Bill Yambrick was the team captain. He also received the team's most outstanding player award.

Schedule

References

Western Michigan
Western Michigan Broncos football seasons
Western Michigan Broncos football